Syzygium stapfianum is a species of plant in the family Myrtaceae. It grows naturally in Peninsular Malaysia and the Philippines.

References

stapfianum
Flora of Peninsular Malaysia
Flora of the Philippines
Taxonomy articles created by Polbot
Plants described in 1901
Taxobox binomials not recognized by IUCN